Hilary Aidan Saint George Saunders MC (14 January 1898 – 16 December 1951) was a British author, born in Clifton near Bristol.

Early life
He was the son of G.W. St George Saunders of Brighton and was educated at Windlesham House School, Downside School and Balliol College, Oxford.

First World War
During World War I he commissioned into the Welsh Guards, and served with 1st battalion on the Western Front. He was awarded the Military Cross for an action on 6 November 1918 near Bavay in northern France. His citation read:

Postwar career
Saunders went by several noms-de-plume: Francis Beeding (writing in tandem with John Palmer), "Barum Browne" (with Geoffrey Dennis), "Cornelius Cofyn" (with John deVere Loder), "David Pilgrim" (with John Palmer), and "John Somers" (with John Palmer).

A chronicler of World War II and biographer of Robert Baden-Powell, Saunders was a recorder on Admiral Mountbatten's staff during World War II. Saunders was Librarian of the House of Commons Library from 1946–1950, when he retired because of ill health.

Saunders became known during World War II for his books and pamphlets, The Battle of Britain, Bomber Command, Coastal Command, etc., which he wrote officially and anonymously for the Government, and subsequently for The Red Beret and The Green Beret. A wartime visit to America for the Ministry of Information was the subject of his Pioneers! O Pioneers! The Sleeping Bacchus is his scarce first and only novel, the story of an art robbery. Saunders was also a postwar commentator on the scouting movements during World War II, chronicled in The Left Handshake, written in 1948.

Works
 The Hidden Kingdom (1927) with John Palmer as Francis Beeding
 The House of Dr. Edwardes (1927) with John Palmer as Francis Beeding
 Death Walks in Eastrepps (1931) with John Palmer as Francis Beeding
 The One Sane Man (1934) with John Palmer as Francis Beeding
 So Great A Man (1937) with John Palmer as David Pilgrim - historical novel about Napoleon.
 No Common Glory (1941) with John Palmer as David Pilgrim - historical novelabout the adventures of one of Charles II's illegitimate sons.
 The Grand Design (1943) with John Palmer as David Pilgrim -sequel to No Common Glory
 Pioneers! O Pioneers! (1944)
 Per Ardua: The Rise of British Air Power, 1911–1939 (1945)
 
 The Green Beret: The Story of the Commandos, Combined Operations, 1940–1945 (1949)
 The Red Beret (1950) 
 The Middlesex Hospital (1950)
 The Sleeping Bacchus (1951)

References

Further reading
 

1898 births
1951 deaths
Military personnel from Bristol
Welsh Guards officers
People associated with Scouting
Recipients of the Military Cross
British Army personnel of World War I
Scouting and Guiding in the United Kingdom
British military writers
People educated at Windlesham House School
People educated at Downside School
Alumni of Balliol College, Oxford
English historical novelists
Writers of historical fiction set in the early modern period
Writers of historical fiction set in the modern age